Four Seasons Hotel Hong Kong is a five-star hotel located in the International Finance Centre complex in Central, Hong Kong near Hong Kong station. It was completed and opened in September 2005. It is a 45-storey building with 399 rooms, of which 54 are suites, and also contains 519 residential units, as part of the Four Seasons Place. It is operated by Canadian-based hotel chain, Four Seasons Hotels and Resorts.

During 2017, the New York Times reported that Chinese-Canadian Xiao Jianhua was abducted from this hotel and taken to mainland China.

Guest rooms and suites
The hotel has 399 guest rooms and suites. There are two styles of guest room - Western contemporary, with silk-paneled walls and marble-floored entry foyers, and rooms with a traditional Chinese influence, featuring sculpted furnishings and gold leaf. The hotel does not have floors numbered 13, 14, 24, 34 or 44.

Dining facilities
Fine dining facilities include Michelin-starred Cantonese restaurant Lung King Heen and the French restaurant Caprice. Received in the guide's inaugural 2009 Hong Kong and Macau edition under Chef de cuisine Chan Yan-tak, Four Seasons Hotel Hong Kong became the first hotel in the world to hold a Chinese restaurant with the maximum of three stars. For 7 years consecutively, Lung King Heen has continued to retain the accolade. Both restaurants were awarded three Michelin stars in Michelin Guide Hong Kong Macau 2019.

Awards
On 11 February 2015, Forbes Travel Guide awarded the hotel a five-star rating.

See also

 List of tallest buildings in Hong Kong
 Xiao Jianhua

References

Central, Hong Kong
Four Seasons hotels and resorts
Hotel buildings completed in 2005
Hotels established in 2005
Hotels in Hong Kong
Skyscraper hotels in Hong Kong
Sun Hung Kai Properties